Troy Dargan (born 15 October 1997) is a Cook Islands international rugby league footballer who plays as a  or  for the Blacktown Workers Sea Eagles in the NSW Cup.

He previously played for the South Sydney Rabbitohs in the National Rugby League (NRL).

Background
Dargan is of Cook Islands and Indigenous Australian descent. He was educated at  Knox Grammar School, Sydney. It was there where he represented the 2014 Australian Schoolboys.

Dargan played his junior rugby league for Cabramatta Two Blues before signing for the Parramatta Eels.

Playing career

2019 
Dargan made his international debut for the Cook Islands against South Africa in a 2021 Rugby League World Cup qualification match. He scored a try in that match as the Cook Islands won 66–6. He also scored two tries in his second match against the United States as the Cook Islands won 38–16.

2020
Dargan made his debut in round 3 of the 2020 NRL season for South Sydney in their 28–12 loss against the Sydney Roosters following the resumption of the sport due to the COVID-19 pandemic.

2021
Dargan made no appearances for South Sydney in the 2021 NRL season. On 8 October, Dargan was released by the South Sydney club.

References

External links
South Sydney Rabbitohs profile

1997 births
Australian rugby league players
Australian people of Cook Island descent
Cook Islands national rugby league team players
South Sydney Rabbitohs players
Rugby league five-eighths
Living people